Mucize (Miracle) is a demo album by Turkish singer Gülşen. It was released on 29 May 2007 by Erol Köse Production without Gülşen's permission and after she controversially terminated her contract with the company. Gülşen applied to the court to stop the distribution of the album and argued that Köse, who released the album and used the compositions without permission, was trying to hinder her work as she was preparing to release Ama Bir Farkla. Despite the legal issues, the album sold 104,000 copies and became one of the top 10 best-selling albums of 2007 in Turkey.

Track listing

References

External links 
 Mucize – Discogs

2007 albums
Gülşen (singer) albums
Turkish-language albums